A grand principality is the territory reigned by a grand prince.

List
 Grand Principality of Moscow
 Grand Principality of Finland
 Grand Principality of Lithuania - for translations see Grand Principality of Lithuania#name
 Serbian Grand Principality - Велика кнежевина Србија
 Grand Principality of Transylvania

See also
 Grand duchy

Monarchy